Pseudoparasitus is a genus of mites in the family Laelapidae.

Species

 Pseudoparasitus annectans (Womersley, 1955)
 Pseudoparasitus arculus Karg, 2003
 Pseudoparasitus australicus (Womersley, 1956)
 Pseudoparasitus bregetovae (Shereef & Soliman, 1981)
 Pseudoparasitus burdwanensis (Bhattacharyya, 1978)
 Pseudoparasitus camini (Domrow, 1957)
 Pseudoparasitus canestrinii (Berlese, 1892)
 Pseudoparasitus centralis Berlese, 1920
 Pseudoparasitus costalis Karg, 1978
 Pseudoparasitus exilis Karg, 1981
 Pseudoparasitus gamagarensis (Jordaan & Loots, 1987)
 Pseudoparasitus gracilipes (Banks, 1916)
 Pseudoparasitus gradulus (Karg, 2003)
 Pseudoparasitus guttulae Karg, 1997
 Pseudoparasitus holaspis (Oudemans, 1902)
 Pseudoparasitus holostaspoides (G. Canestrini, 1884)
 Pseudoparasitus indicus Bhattacharyya, 1977
 Pseudoparasitus interruptus Karg, 1994
 Pseudoparasitus juvencus Berlese, 1916
 Pseudoparasitus krantzi (Hunter, 1967)
 Pseudoparasitus leptochelae Karg, 1994
 Pseudoparasitus lignicola (G. Canestrini & R. Canestrini, 1882)
 Pseudoparasitus longospinosus (Karg, 2000)
 Pseudoparasitus marginatus Karg, 1997
 Pseudoparasitus meridionalis (G. Canestrini & R. Canestrini, 1882)
 Pseudoparasitus mexicana (Banks, 1915)
 Pseudoparasitus missouriensis (Ewing, 1909)
 Pseudoparasitus myrmicophilus (Berlese, 1892)
 Pseudoparasitus myrmophilus (Michael, 1891)
 Pseudoparasitus nasipodaliae Karg, 1993
 Pseudoparasitus nudus (Karg, 2000)
 Pseudoparasitus obovata (Womersley, 1960)
 Pseudoparasitus ocularis Karg, 1981
 Pseudoparasitus ordwayae (Eickwort, 1966)
 Pseudoparasitus parasitizans Berlese, 1916
 Pseudoparasitus parvioculus (Karg, 2000)
 Pseudoparasitus pinguis Karg, 1997
 Pseudoparasitus placentula (Berlese, 1887)
 Pseudoparasitus placidus (Banks, 1895)
 Pseudoparasitus planus (Womersley, 1956)
 Pseudoparasitus porulatus Karg, 1989
 Pseudoparasitus quadrisetatus Karg, 1981
 Pseudoparasitus rectagoni Karg, 1993
 Pseudoparasitus reniculus Karg, 1981
 Pseudoparasitus reticulatus Karg, 1978
 Pseudoparasitus retiventer (Karg, 2000)
 Pseudoparasitus schatzi Karg, 1993
 Pseudoparasitus sellnicki (Bregetova & Koroleva, 1964)
 Pseudoparasitus sinensis (Wang, Zhou & Ji, 1991)
 Pseudoparasitus sitalaensis (Bhattacharyya, 1978)
 Pseudoparasitus spathulatus Berlese, 1920
 Pseudoparasitus spinosus (Berlese, 1920)
 Pseudoparasitus stigmatus (Fox, 1946)
 Pseudoparasitus submyrmecophila Xu & Liang, 1996
 Pseudoparasitus sulcus (Karg, 2003)
 Pseudoparasitus tasmanicus (Womersley, 1956)
 Pseudoparasitus tonsilis Karg, 1989
 Pseudoparasitus translineatus Barylo, 1991
 Pseudoparasitus triquetrus Karg, 2003
 Pseudoparasitus unospinosus Karg, 1978
 Pseudoparasitus venetus (Berlese, 1904)
 Pseudoparasitus vitzthumi (Womersley, 1956)
 Pseudoparasitus wangi (Bai, Gu & Wang, 1996)
 Pseudoparasitus weishanensis (Gu & Guo, 1997)
 Pseudoparasitus zaheri (Afifi & Abdel-Halim, 1988)

References

Laelapidae